Tjong A Fie Mansion  is a two-story mansion in Medan, North Sumatra, built by Tjong A Fie (1860–1921) a Hakka merchant who came to own much of the land in Medan through his plantations, later becoming 'Majoor der Chineezen' (leader of the Chinese') in Medan and constructing the Medan-Belawan railway.

Tjong A Fie is said to be related to Cheong Fatt Tze, who built the Cheong Fatt Tze Mansion in Penang, Malaysia.

The building is constructed in Chinese-European-Art Deco style, and was completed in 1900. Although it has been stated in some sources to have been modeled on the Cheong Fatt Tze Mansion in Penang, Malaysia, that mansion was not completed until 1904.

External links
Official Website
Tjong A Fie Mansion

Buildings and structures in Medan
Houses in Indonesia
Dutch colonial architecture in Indonesia
Tourist attractions in North Sumatra